The OFC qualification for the 2014 FIFA World Cup saw teams of the Oceania Football Confederation competing for a place in the finals held in Brazil.

Format
The initial format was scheduled to begin in August 2011 at the 2011 Pacific Games in Noumea, New Caledonia, where the men's football tournament was to double as the first stage of the OFC World Cup qualifying competition.

However, in June 2011 the format was amended, and the Pacific Games were no longer part of the qualification process. The new structure saw the four lowest ranked entrants play a single round-robin tournament from 22 to 26 November 2011 in Samoa.  The top team in this tournament will then joined the other seven teams in the 2012 OFC Nations Cup, with the four semi-finalists from that tournament advancing to Round Three.  This stage was originally scheduled to be held in Fiji in June 2012, but on 14 March 2012 the hosting rights were stripped from Fiji as a result of an ongoing legal dispute involving OFC general secretary Tai Nicholas and Fijian authorities. The loss of the finals was confirmed by the Fiji Football Association on 16 March.

Round Three, consisted of a double round-robin held on a home-and-away basis, scheduled to take place between 7 September 2012 and 26 March 2013.  The Round Three winners competed in the intercontinental play-offs with CONCACAF's fourth-placed team, which was chosen through a random draw, rather than being decided by FIFA beforehand as in previous tournaments (e.g., 2010 against a team from AFC, 2006 against a team from CONMEBOL).

An early proposal to allow the qualifying winner to the final group stage of AFC qualification was submitted by New Zealand Football to FIFA. This proposal, supported by OFC, would have replaced the intercontinental play-off that has been used in recent qualification tournaments, but was not adopted.

Entrants
The July 2011 FIFA Ranking is shown in brackets.

First round

Based on FIFA ranks and other sporting considerations, the first round featured American Samoa, Cook Islands, Samoa and Tonga and were played as a single round-robin tournament in Samoa from 22 to 26 November 2011. The winner of the group advanced to the second round.

Second round

The winner of the first round joined the remaining seven OFC teams in the 2012 OFC Nations Cup.  The four semi-finalists (the top two teams from each group in the group stage) advanced to the third round. The groups were drawn at the World Cup Preliminary Draw at the Marina da Glória in Rio de Janeiro, Brazil on 30 July 2011.

The tournament was held in the Solomon Islands from 1 to 10 June 2012. Fiji had been the proposed host, but had their hosting rights revoked on 14 March 2012.

Seeding
The teams were seeded into two pots of 4 based on the July 2011 FIFA World Rankings – with the first round winner automatically seeded eighth. Each group consisted of two teams from each pot.

† First round winner whose identity was not known at the time of the draw.

Group stage

Group A

Group B

Knockout stage
The four semi-finalists in the 2012 OFC Nations Cup advanced to the third round of World Cup qualifying, despite the outcome of the final knockout rounds of the OFC Nations Cup itself.  The final results of the OFC Nations cup knockout stage matches do count in other ways as part of the World Cup qualifying, with FIFA counting goalscorers in the qualifying statistics, and cards given may contribute to suspensions in the third round of World Cup qualifying.

Third round

The four remaining teams played a double round-robin between 7 September 2012 and 26 March 2013, with the top team advancing to the intercontinental play-off.

Note that – unlike the previously announced format – this means the team that advances to the intercontinental play-off may be different from the team that wins the OFC Nations Cup, and represents the OFC at the 2013 Confederations Cup.

The draw for the fixtures was conducted at OFC Headquarters in Auckland, New Zealand on 26 June 2012. The matches were scheduled to take place in the period from 7 September 2012 to 26 March 2013.

Inter-confederation play-offs

The winner of the OFC qualification tournament, New Zealand, played against CONCACAF's fourth-placed team, Mexico, in a home-and-away play-off. Mexico, the winner of this play-off, qualified for the 2014 FIFA World Cup.

The first leg was played on 13 November 2013, and the second leg was played on 20 November 2013.

Goalscorers
There were 124 goals scored in 36 games (including inter-confederation play-offs), for an average of 3.44 goals per game.

Note: Statistics include goals scored in the knockout stage of the OFC Nations Cup as these matches are also considered by FIFA as part of the qualifiers.

8 goals

 Georges Gope-Fenepej

7 goals

 Jacques Haeko
 Chris Wood

5 goals

 Bertrand Kaï
 Shane Smeltz
 Lorenzo Tehau

4 goals

 Roy Kayara
 César Lolohea
 Benjamin Totori
 Alvin Tehau
 Jonathan Tehau

3 goals

 Chris Killen
 Robert Tasso

2 goals

 Shalom Luani
 Campbell Best
 Iamel Kabeu
 Michael McGlinchey
 Tim Payne
 Tommy Smith
 Chris James
 Luki Gosche
 Silao Malo
 Henry Fa'arodo
 Himson Teleda
 Steevy Chong Hue
 Teaonui Tehau
 Nicolas Vallar
 Jean Nako Naprapol

1 goal

 Ramin Ott
 Grover Harmon
 Maciu Dunadamu
 Marius Bako
 Kalaje Gnipate
 Judikael Ixoée
 Dick Kauma
 Kosta Barbarouses
 Tony Lochhead
 Marco Rojas
 Rory Fallon
 Neil Hans
 Kema Jack
 Albert Bell
 Shaun Easthope
 Joses Nawo
 Tutizama Tanito
 Heimano Bourebare
 Roihau Degage
 Samuel Hyanine
 Unaloto Feao
 Kinitoni Falatau
 Timote Maamaaloa
 Lokoua Taufahema
 Brian Kaltack
 Derek Malas
 Freddy Vava

1 Own Goal

 Tala Luvu (playing against the Cook Islands)
 Tome Faisi (playing against New Caledonia)
 Xavier Samin (playing against New Caledonia)

References

External links
Results and schedule (FIFA.com version)
Results and schedule (oceaniafootball.com version)
First round
Second round (OFC Nations Cup)
Third round

 
Ofc
FIFA World Cup qualification (OFC)